Factory Point is a small point on the west side and close to the head of Leith Harbour, in Stromness Bay, South Georgia. The name was probably given by whalers because of its nearness to Messrs. Salvesen and Company's whaling station near the head of Leith Harbour.

References 

Headlands of South Georgia